Vitar may refer to:

Vitar violins
Mike Vitar (born 1978), American child actor